Karl Riedel (born 13 March 1913) was an Austrian rower. He competed in the men's coxed four event at the 1948 Summer Olympics.

References

External links
 

1913 births
Year of death missing
Austrian male rowers
Olympic rowers of Austria
Rowers at the 1948 Summer Olympics
Place of birth missing